WEVT-LP (98.1 FM) is a radio station licensed to Enosburg Falls, Vermont, United States. The station is owned by Spavin Cure Historical Group.
WEVT-LP is one of the oldest Low Power FM Stations in Vermont, with broadcasting starting on November 15, 2004.

The station was started as part of the project to renovate the Spavin Cure Building in Enosburg Falls, Vermont. This building was the manufacturing site of Kendall's Spavin Cure, a patent medicine made at the turn of the century. The renovation has been put on hold for the present.

The station was off the air for a number of years after vandals damaged the station and took key equipment. Broadcasting resumed April, 2011.

The current programming format for WEVT-LP consists of classic 1950s and 1960s oldies. The station has put together a fairly good library of music, including many doo-opp hits of the 1950s. At night, the programming switches to classic and modern rock. On Sunday mornings and holidays WEVT-LP presents "American Popular Standards" featuring selections from the Big Band era and the Great American Songbook. Currently, WEVT-LP is the only station in Vermont offering an oldies or standards format.

WEVT-LP can be heard in the town of Enosburgh and several surrounding towns, including Sheldon, Franklin, Berkshire, Richford, Montgomery, Bakersfield and Fairfield. WEVT-LP can also be heard on its website.

External links
 
 

EVT-LP
EVT-LP
Radio stations established in 2004
2004 establishments in Vermont